Cobalt-59 nuclear magnetic resonance is a form of nuclear magnetic resonance spectroscopy that uses cobalt-59, a cobalt isotope. 59Co is a nucleus of spin 7/2 and 100% abundancy. The nucleus has a magnetic quadrupole moment. Among all NMR active nuclei, 59Co has the largest chemical shift range and the chemical shift can be correlated with the spectrochemical series. Resonances are observed over a range of 20000 ppm, the width of the signals being up to 20 kHz. A widely used standard is potassium hexacyanocobaltate (0.1M K3Co(CN)6 in D2O), which, due to its high symmetry, has a rather small line width. Systems of low symmetry can yield broadened signals to an extent that renders the signals unobservable in fluid phase NMR, in these cases signals can still be observable in solid state NMR.

References 

Nuclear magnetic resonance
Cobalt